Richard Armstrong Crouch (19 June 1868 – 7 April 1949) was an Australian politician. His two periods as a member of the House of Representatives (1901–1910, 1929–1931) were separated by the First World War, during which he became an anti-conscription activist and changed his political affiliation. Crouch was a Protectionist and Liberal during his first period as an MP, but later became involved in the labour movement and represented the Australian Labor Party (ALP) during his second term. He is one of the few MPs to move to the ALP after previously belonging to an anti-Labor party.

Early life
Crouch was born on 19 June 1868 at Ballarat East, Victoria, the son of George Crouch from Tottenham, London, who was a miner, storekeeper and later a wealthy boot-retailer, and his wife Selina Durham, née Marks, from Aberdeen, Scotland.

Pre-war politics

In 1901, Crouch was elected to the new Federal Parliament for the electorate of Corio, with a majority of 1,130 votes, as a member of the Protectionist Party (later the Commonwealth Liberal Party). He served for nine years, under the leadership of Alfred Deakin, and was at the time the youngest member of the lower house. He gained recognition as a wit and a radical, and was outspoken on the delicate matter of lavish allowances for the Governor General.

World War I
Crouch enthusiastically supported new trends in Australian defence policies. He joined the militia in 1892, and by the outbreak of World War I had attained the rank of lieutenant colonel. In March 1915, he was given command of the 22nd Battalion, Australian Imperial Force, which landed at Gallipoli in September 1915. Crouch was transferred to command the Base Camp at Mudros in December 1915, but illness led to his return to Australia in March 1916.

Although a strong advocate for national defence, Crouch did not support the proposal to introduce compulsory overseas service. He became Victorian branch president of the Returned Soldiers' No-Conscription League, and campaigned against prime minister Billy Hughes during the conscription plebiscites in 1916 and 1917. Encouraged by James Scullin, Crouch joined the Labor Party and became an active leader of the Labor movement in Victoria.

Post-war politics

In 1924 Crouch represented Australia at the International Federation of Trade Unions Education Conference in Oxford. In 1929, he was re-elected to the federal parliament for the electorate of Corangamite, representing the Labor Party. Defeated two years later, he decided to forsake politics for philanthropy, travel, writing, and encouraging Australians to take a greater interest in their history. He was the donor of the first six busts at Prime Ministers Avenue at Ballarat, and bequeathed funds for maintaining the project.

Personal life
Crouch remained unmarried during his lifetime and in his later years lived with his sister Gertrude at Point Lonsdale, Victoria in the house their father had built in 1882. He died aged 80 on 7 April 1949, leaving an estate valued at £43,490, and was buried at Point Lonsdale.

References
 Australian Dictionary of Biography - Crouch, Richard Armstrong (1868 - 1949)

Australian Labor Party members of the Parliament of Australia
Members of the Australian House of Representatives for Corio
Members of the Australian House of Representatives for Corangamite
Members of the Australian House of Representatives
1868 births
1949 deaths
Protectionist Party members of the Parliament of Australia
Commonwealth Liberal Party members of the Parliament of Australia
20th-century Australian politicians
Australian military personnel of World War I